The teams which took part at the 1997 Rugby World Cup Sevens held in Hong Kong named squads of ten players each.

Pool A

Adedayo Adebayo
 Neil Back
 Nick Beal
 Mike Catt
 Austin Healey
 Richard Hill
 Tim Rodber
 Dave Scully
 Chris Sheasby
 Jonathan Sleightholme

Head Coach: Doug Tate
 Rob Card
 Gregor Dixon
 Barry Ebl
 John Graf
 Jason Hartley
 Dave Lougheed
 Mike Schmid
 Winston Stanley
 Scott Stewart
 Ron Toews

Ryan Bekker
 Craig Brown
 Innocent Chidziva
 Patrick Ewing
 Campbell Graham
 Isaac Mbereko
 Charlton McNab
 Victor Olonga
 William Schultz
 Kennedy Tsimba

Pool B

Gabriel Brezoianu
Vasile Brici
Lucian Colceriu
Constantin Dragnea
Cătălin Drăguceanu
Save Lutumailagi
Alin Petrache
Margant Rădoi
Lucian Sîrbu
Gheorghe Solomie
Sorin Trancă

Michael Brial (NSW Waratahs)
David Campese  (NSW Waratahs)
Ryan Constable (QLD Reds)
David Kelaher
Stephen Larkham (ACT Brumbies)
John Moss
Matthew Mostyn
Damian Smith (QLD Reds)
Semi Taupeaafe
Roy Wayne Williams

Nick Broughton
Graeme Burns
James Craig 
Cameron Glasgow
Duncan Hodge
Derrick Lee
Cameron Mather
Scott Nichol
Sikeli Votonisoga
Murray Wallace

Pool C

Coach: Gordon Tietjens
Alama Ieremia
Glen Osborne 
Caleb Ralph
Roger Randle
Eric Rush
Owen Scrimgeour
Joe Tauiwi
Rua Tipoki
Nick Penny
Peter Woods

Head Coach:   Paulo Nawalu
Hiroyuki Kajihara
Shinji Ono 
Bruce Ferguson
Takeomi Ito
Hiroyuki Tanuma
Kiyoshi Imazumi
Kensuke Iwabuchi
Daisuke Ohata
Stephen Miln
Hiroki Ozeki

Maama Molitika
Siua Taumalolo 
Ofa Topeni
Tevita Tu'ifua
Viliami Uhi
Tevita Vaʻenuku
Lui Veseseyaki
William Faka'osi
Sione Moa Latu
Saia Moeakiolo
Isi Fatani

Pool D

Manasa Bari
Leveni Duvuduvukula 
Luke Erenavula
Lemeki Koroi
Inoke Maraiwai
Tamiela Naikelekele
Waisale Serevi
Aminiasi Naituyaga
Jope Tuikabe
Marika Vunibaka

Miguel Barbosa
Jon Dingley 
Vasco Durão
José Maria Vilar Gomes
Rohan Hoffmann
João Diogo Marques
Nuno Mourão
Pedro Murinello
Pedro Netto Fernandes
Luís Pissarra
Miguel Sá

Head Coach: George Simpkin
Hamish Bowden
Robin Bredbury 
Fuk Ping Chan
Riaz Fredericks
Vaughan Going
Steve Kidd
Stuart Krohn
Rodney McIntosh
Luke Nabaro
Rob Santos
Isi Tuivai

Pool E

Philippe Bernat-Salles
Olivier Campan 
Franck Corrihons
Marc Lièvremont
Thomas Lièvremont
Olivier Magne
Ugo Mola
Meli Nakauta
Mickaël Noël
Frédéric Séguier
Willy Taofifénua

Head Coach: Mark Williams
Vaea Anitoni
Andre Bachelet 
Jim Burgett
Jon Campbell
Malakai Delai
Brian Gallagher
Brian Hightower
Dan Lyle
Chris Morrow
Richard Tardits (c)

Chae Deuk-Joon
Cho Jin-Sik 
Choi Chang-Yul
Kim Jae-Hyun
Kim Sung-Nam
Lee Keun-Wook
Park Jin-Bae
Sung Hae-Kyung
Yong Hwan-Myung
Yoo Min-Suk

Pool F

Álvar Enciso
Pablo Calderón
Jon Azkargorta
Francisco Puertas Soto
Oriol Ripol
Alberto Socías
Carlos Souto
Philippe Tayeb
Jorge Torres
Ferrán Velazco

Bryan Adams
Amosa Amosa 
Grand Hagai
Save Lutumailagi
David Nekeare
Ryan Nicholas
Junior Charlie Noo
Terry Piri
Anthony Ruakere
Peter Tari
Aquila Tunisau
Alan Tyrrell

Mohamed Ahlalou
Yassine Alami 
My Omar Nasrallah Alaoui
Hamid Amina
Aziz Andoh
Faycal Boukanoucha
Kazu Bouzedi
Mohamed Dermouni
Redouane Habbal
Abdelaziz Mesror
Carl Murray

Pool G

Head Coach: Ray Southam
Jonny Bell
Ben Cronin
Kieron Dawson
Denis Hickie
David Humphreys
Niall Malone
Denis McBride
Eric Miller
Richard Wallace
Niall Woods

Head Coach: Bernardo Otaño
Lisandro Arbizu (Belgrano Athletic)
Pablo Bouza (Duendes)
Gonzalo Camardón (Alumni)
Gonzalo García (Duendes)
Marcos Garicoche (CA San Isidro)
Leandro Lobrauco (Atlético del Rosario)
Santiago Phelan (CA San Isidro)
Eduardo Simone (Liceo Naval)
Facundo Soler (Tala RC)
Cristian Viel (Newman)

Head Coach: Dawie Snyman
Graeme Bouwer
Stephen Brink 
Jacques Olivier
Breyton Paulse
Pieter Rossouw
Bobby Skinstad
André Snyman
Jeffrey Stevens
Joost van der Westhuizen (c)
Andre Venter

Pool H

Johan Britz
Dirk Farmer 
André Greeff
Kobus Horn
Quinn Hough
Gerhard Mans
Jaco Olivier
Ronaldo Pedro
Schalk van der Merwe
Johan Zaayman

Kalolo Toleafoa
Isaac Fe'aunati
Rudolf Moors
Brian Lima
Tainafi Patu 
Afato So'oalo
Terry Fanolua
Sila Vaifale
Laiafi Papali'i
Semo Sititi

Allan Bateman
Darren Edwards 
Jason Forster
Dafydd James
Kevin Morgan
Wayne Proctor
Jamie Ringer
Gareth Thomas
Christopher Wyatt
Gareth Wyatt

References

Rugby World Cup Sevens squads